Mieszko Bolesławowic (c. 1069 – 1089) was the only son of Bolesław II the Generous, King of Poland. Mieszko was Prince of Cracow from 1086 until his death in 1089.

Biography 
Mieszko was, in all likelihood, born in Cracow sometime around or during A.D. 1069. He was the eldest son of the king of Poland Bolesław II the Bold and his wife Wyszeslawa. According to the Chronicler Gallus Anonymus, Mieszko was being groomed for the responsibilities of a monarch from an early age. At the age of ten, his father, Bolesław, was deposed by a rebellion led by his brother, Władysław I Herman. Mieszko was forced to leave his country and his education behind and seek refuge at the friendly court of Ladislaus I of Hungary. The king of Hungary was apparently very fond of young Mieszko and treated him like a son.

Return to Poland 
Following the death of his father in 1081, Mieszko remained in Hungary until 1086 when he is known to have returned to his homeland. There are two conflicting versions explaining the circumstances of this return. Chronicler Gallus Anonymus simply states that Mieszko was peacefully summoned to Poland by his uncle Władysław I Herman. It is likely that this was facilitated by a deal between Ladislaus I of Hungary and Władysław I Herman. Another version, publicized by a Hungarian chronicler, claims that in 1086 Ladislaus I of Hungary invaded the Kingdom of Poland, took control of Cracow, and installed Mieszko as its ruler.

Prince of Cracow 
Though there is no direct primary source evidence for this, notes in Cracow almanacs strongly suggest that during the years 1086 - 1089 Mieszko was prince of Cracow. However, sometime during this time he accepted over-lordship of his uncle Wladyslaw I Herman, and gave up his hereditary claim to the crown of Poland in exchange for becoming first in line to succeed him. It is also during this time (1088) that he married a Turov princess (from Ruthenia) Euphraxia of Turov, a daughter of Izyaslav I and Gertrude of Poland.

Death 
According to Gallus Anonymus the young prince was poisoned during a feast on orders of palatine Sieciech (who as Gallus Anonymus wrote wanted to "kill off the entire Piast dynasty") in Cracow in 1089. The death of Mieszko, the rightful pretender to the throne, allowed Władysław to strengthen his rule over Poland; Sieciech, after failed attempts to kill all of Władysław's sons, would be exiled.

References 

1060s births
1089 deaths
Piast dynasty
Deaths by poisoning
11th-century Polish people
People of Byzantine descent